The  hole is a concept in , a genre of fictional media depicting homoerotic relations between men aimed at a female audience, that supposes the existence of a male sexual organ that is neither a penis nor an anus. The concept arose from depictions of anal sex in some  works that appeared to defy typical anatomy and physiology, such as representations of penetrative sex in positions that do not correspond to the location of the passive partner's anus. The  hole as a phenomenon has been alternately considered as reflecting a lack of understanding about male anatomy and anal sex possessed by the (mostly female and heterosexual) writers of early , and as an intentional exaggeration reflecting a desire for fantasy over realism in pornographic fiction narratives.

Context and etymology
However, sexual acts and sex organs in early  works were often rendered inaccurately: the sexual positions in which the male subjects were joined in penetrative sex seemingly did not correspond to the correct location of the passive partner's anus, or the receptive partner would self-lubricate in a manner atypical of an anus. These representations were initially criticized as reflecting an ignorance of the mechanics of anal sex on the part of  authors, and derisively suggested to imply the existence of a distinct sexual organ that would come to be referred to as the " hole". Some authors embraced the concept of the  hole in response, and began to either jokingly or earnestly depict it in their works.

The  hole has been described as a "third sexual organ" that is neither feminine nor masculine. Ayako Shiramine, a former librarian at the Yoshihiro Yonezawa Memorial Library, analyzed 51  works and concluded that the orifices depicted "do not seem to be an anus", as there were not definite descriptions of the orifice being an anus and it did not function like one, and concluded that the  hole is a separate entity from the anus.

The origin of the term " hole" to describe this phenomenon is unknown, though sociologist and   researcher  speculates that it may have arisen around the year 2000 as a lingua franca for  fans to communicate with each other on the Internet.

History 
Junko Kaneda divides expressions of the  hole in fiction into three distinct periods from the 1970s to the 1990s:
 The 1970s were the "age without holes".
 The 1980s were the "age of hole-discovery". Though the first depiction of a  hole is unknown, she notes that  works during this period began to make clear references to non-oral penetrative sex, such as in Kaoru Kurimoto's novel .
 The 1990s were the "age of prostate-discovery", with an increase in depictions of prostate stimulation via fingering.

Since the 2000s,  has depicted male-male sex with a greater degree of realism, referencing activities such as rectal douching and dry orgasms. Kaneda speculates that this may be due to the fact that media depicting male-male sex, such as educational books and gay pornography, has become more readily accessible due to the Internet.

Characteristics 
The  hole is associated with depictions of anal sex in  that would seem to defy typical anatomy and physiology. This includes as depictions of sex in the missionary position where the passive partner's legs are laid flat and not spread eagle, appendages and objects being easily inserted into the receptive partner without the use of personal lubricant, the absence of preparation for anal sex (through activities such as rectal douching), and in some stories, the inclusion of male pregnancy and childbirth.

The BL news site Chill Chill considered the hypothesis that  juice was intestinal fluid, but concluded that intestinal fluid lacks the necessary viscosity, lubricity, and quantity to be used as lubricant.

Involuntary movement of the receptive partner's orifice, such as twitching or tightening, also occurs in  hole stories. Ayako Shiramine, a former librarian at the Yoshihiro Yonezawa Memorial Library, considers that this kind of depiction may be used to communicate pleasure on the part of the receptive partner.

Analysis 

The  hole phenomenon can be understood in some regards as simply reflecting the lack of understanding about male anatomy and anal sex possessed by the (mostly female and heterosexual) writers of early . Alternately,  holes can be understood as an intentional exaggeration reflecting a desire for fantasy over realism in pornographic fiction narratives, with parallels to the depiction of women with exaggerated or unnatural anatomy in male-oriented erotic manga.

According to a survey conducted among the roughly one hundred attendees at the 2014 event "Let's talk about the future of the  hole", the largest faction was " holes do not not exist, it is an anus" at 33%, followed by "I don't care about  holes,  is a fantasy" at 27%, and " holes do exist, the anus becomes a  hole during sex" third at 18%.

Related 
 , genre depicting characters with both male and female genitalia
 Omegaverse, genre depicting dominance hierarchies in humans with male pregnancy as a common theme

Notes

References

Bibliography

Yaoi
Internet slang
Japanese sex terms
Sexual slang